The Museo de la Fundación Romulo Raggio is a museum located in Vicente López Partido, Buenos Aires, Argentina.

The museum is operated by the Rómulo Raggio Foundation. It is housed in a  1930 neoclassic palace that has been declared of municipal interest.

References

External links
 Fundación Romulo Raggio website

Museums with year of establishment missing
Museums in Buenos Aires
Palaces in Buenos Aires